Lionel Belasco Maracaibo (Venezuela) 1881 – ) was a prominent Venezuelan pianist, composer and bandleader, best known for his calypso recordings.

Biography
According to various sources, Belasco was born in Maracaibo (Venezuela), the son of an Afro-Caribbean mother and a Sephardic Jewish father. He spent his early childhood in Port of Spain, Trinidad and Tobago, and grew up in Trinidad. He traveled widely in the Caribbean and South America in his youth, absorbing a wide variety of musical influences.  He was leading his own band by 1902, and made his first phonograph recordings in Trinidad in 1914.

See also 
Calipso

References

External links
 Lionel Belasco recordings at the Discography of American Historical Recordings.
 https://web.archive.org/web/20110616102802/http://www.nalis.gov.tt/Biography/bio_Lionel_Belasco1.html

1881 births
1967 deaths
American bandleaders
American Sephardic Jews
American people of Trinidad and Tobago descent
American people of Venezuelan-Jewish descent
Calypsonians
People from Maracaibo
People from Port of Spain
20th-century Trinidad and Tobago male singers
20th-century Trinidad and Tobago singers
Venezuelan Jews